Pompey the Conqueror (Spanish: Pompeyo el conquistador) is a 1953 Mexican comedy drama film directed by René Cardona and starring Joaquín Pardavé, Manolo Fábregas and Pepita Morillo.

The film's sets were designed by Manuel Fontanals.

Partial cast
 Joaquín Pardavé as Don Pompeyo Gallo / Froilán  
 Manolo Fábregas as Carlos  
 Pepita Morillo as Rosaura  
 Lily Aclemar as Milagros  
 Jorge Sareli as Almirindo Campeiro, esposo de Palmira  
 Gloria Mestre as Lucila  
 Jesús Valero as Doctor Sarcófago Puntilla  
 Tana Lynn as Palmira  
 Roberto Cobo as Crisanto Naranjo  
 Antonio Monsell as Beto  
 Julián de Meriche as Maestro de baile

References

Bibliography 
 María Luisa Amador. Cartelera cinematográfica, 1950-1959. UNAM, 1985.

External links 
 

1953 films
1953 comedy-drama films
Mexican comedy-drama films
1950s Spanish-language films
Films directed by René Cardona
Mexican black-and-white films
1950s Mexican films